The Child is a 1940 Danish drama film directed by Benjamin Christensen.

Cast
 Agis Winding as the mother
 Bjarne Forchhammer as Albert
 Charles Tharnæs as Elias
 Beatrice Bonnesen as Cora
 Mogens Wieth as Pontus
 Inger Lassen as Anna
 Gunnar Lauring as Henrik
 Lis Smed as Ilse

References

External links
 

1940 films
1940 drama films
Danish drama films
1940s Danish-language films
Danish black-and-white films
Films directed by Benjamin Christensen